Mr. Lonely may refer to:

 "Mr. Lonely" (Bobby Vinton song), 1964
 "Lonely" (Akon song), 2005
 "911 / Mr. Lonely", 2017
 "Mr. Lonely" (Midland song), 2019
 Mister Lonely, a 2007 film